The American Elasmobranch Society (AES) is a professional society devoted to the study of chondrichthyans (sharks, skates, rays and chimaeras).

External links
 American Elasmobranch Society

Sharks
Zoology organizations